Sandrine Kabamba (born 5 June 1979) is a Congolese handball player for Olney Handball and the DR Congo national team.

References

1979 births
Living people
Democratic Republic of the Congo female  handball players